Gustavo Álvarez (born 27 October 1972) is an Argentine football manager and former player who played as a left back. He is the current manager of Chilean club Huachipato.

References

External links

1972 births
Living people
Sportspeople from Buenos Aires Province
Argentine footballers
Association football defenders
Arsenal de Sarandí footballers
Club Atlético Temperley footballers
Barracas Central players
Centro Social y Recreativo Español players
Argentine football managers
Argentine Primera División managers
Primera B Nacional managers
Club Atlético Patronato managers
Aldosivi managers
Sport Boys managers
Huachipato managers
Argentine expatriate football managers
Argentine expatriate sportspeople in Peru
Argentine expatriate sportspeople in Chile
Expatriate football managers in Peru
Expatriate football managers in Chile
Atlético Grau managers